Thivolleo xanthographa is a moth in the family Crambidae. It was described by George Hampson in 1913. It is found in Nigeria and the Democratic Republic of the Congo.

References

Further reading
 

Moths described in 1913
Pyraustinae